The A. G. Pless Jr. House is a historic home located at Galax, Virginia.  It was completed in 1939, and consists of a three-story, side gabled main section with a three-story rear wing, one-story west wing, and one-story, shed roofed sun porch on the east.  The house is in the Colonial Revival style.  It features flanking brick end chimneys. Also on the property is a contributing garage.

It was listed on the National Register of Historic Places in 2002.

References

Houses on the National Register of Historic Places in Virginia
Colonial Revival architecture in Virginia
Houses completed in 1939
Houses in Galax, Virginia
National Register of Historic Places in Galax, Virginia